was a feudal domain under the Tokugawa shogunate of Edo period Japan, located in Kōzuke Province (modern-day Gunma Prefecture), Japan. It was centered on Maebashi Castle in what is now part of the city of Maebashi, Gunma.

History
Maebashi was the location of an important fortification in the Sengoku period on a strategic junction of the Tone River with the main highway from Edo to Echigo Province and the Sea of Japan with the Nakasendō highway connecting Edo with Kyoto. The area was hotly contested between the Uesugi clan and the Takeda and Odawara Hōjō clans.

After Tokugawa Ieyasu took control over the Kantō region in 1590, he assigned the area to his trusted general,  Hiraiwa Chikayoshi, with revenues of 33,000 koku.  Following the establishment of the Tokugawa shogunate, the Hiraiwa were transferred to Kōfu Castle and were replaced by a branch of the Sakai clan, formerly daimyō of Kawagoe Domain. The Sakai ruled over nine generations from 1601 to 1749, during which time the domain was gradually enlarged to 150,000 koku. The 2nd daimyō, Sakai Tadayo and 4th daimyō, Sakai Tadakiyo served as tairō within the shogunal administration.

After the Sakai were transferred to Himeji Domain, they were replaced the a branch of the Matsudaira clan from Echizen Province, and Matsudaira Tomonori ruled from 1749 to 1767. However, erosion from the Tone River and repeated flooding continued to plague the castle, and in 1767 Matsudaira Tomonori decided to relocate his seat from Maebashi to Kawagoe Castle, demoting Maebashi Domain to a detached territory of Kawagoe Domain.

Towards the Bakumatsu period, the growing prosperity and economic importance of Maebashi due to the silk trade led to the local townspeople petitioning their lord for his return to Maebashi Castle. The Tokugawa shogunate also looked to Maebashi as a possible refuge should Edo be attacked by the western powers, and supported the move.  A new Maebashi castle was completed in 1866, and the Matsudaira clan relocated back to Maebashi in 1867.  During the Boshin War, Maebashi Domain was quick to side with the imperial cause. However, the domain’s detached exclave in Futtsu sided with the Tokugawa and one of the rōjū of the parent domain in Maebashi was forced to commit seppuku in atonement.

After the end of the conflict, with the abolition of the han system in July 1871, Maebashi Domain became “Maebashi Prefecture”, which later became part of Gunma Prefecture.

Holdings at the end of the Edo period
As with most domains in the han system, Maebashi Domain consisted of several discontinuous territories calculated to provide the assigned kokudaka, based on periodic cadastral surveys and projected agricultural yields,

Kōzuke Province
60 villages in Gunma District
102 villages in Seta District
2 villages in Sai District
15 villages in Nawa District
21 villages in Nitta
1 village in Yamada District
10 villages in Ōra District
Shimotsuke Province
4 villages in Aso District
3 villages in Ashikaga District
Hitachi Province
25 villages in Kōchi District
7 villages in Tsukuba District
Musashi Province
13 villages in Tama District
13 villages in Saitama District
65 villages in Hiki District
20 villages in Koma District
11 villages in Iruma District
2 villages in Hanzawa District
4 villages in Kodama District
7 villages in Chichibu District
3 villages in Naka District
11 villages in Ōsato District
Awa Province
31 villages in Asai District
19 villages in Hei District
18 villages in Awa District
Kazusa Province
17 villages in Amaha District
20 villages in Sue District
74 villages in Mōda District
Omi Province
10 villages in Kurita District
 2 villages in Yasu District
1 village in Gamo District

List of daimyō

Genealogy (Matsudaira-Echizen)

 Tokugawa Ieyasu, 1st Tokugawa Shōgun (1543-1616)
Yūki Hideyasu,  1st Lord of Fukui (1574-1607)
 Matsudaira Naomoto, Lord of Himeji (1604-1648)
 Naonori, Lord of Shirakawa (1642-1695)
 Chikakiyo, 1st Lord of Shirakawa (1682-1721)
 Akinori, 2nd Lord of Shirakawa (1713-1749)
  I. Tomonori, 1st Lord of Maebashi (1st cr., 1749) (1738-1768; r. 1749-1767)
 Naotsune, 2nd Lord of Kawagoe (1762-1810)
Naritsune, 4th Lord of Kawagoe (1797-1850)
 Tsunenori, 5th Lord of Kawagoe (1836-1883)
 Motonori, 13th Echizen family head, 1st Count (1875-1930; 13th family head: 1884-1907; Count: cr. 1884)
 Yoihiro (1808-1855)
 Megumi-hime (1850-1885), m.  I. Matsudaira (Arima) Naokatsu, 1st Lord of Maebashi (2nd cr., 1867) (1840-1897; r. 1867-1869)
 Naoyuki, 14th Echizen family head, 2nd Count (1861-1932; 14th family head and 2nd Count: 1907-1932)
 Naohisa, 15th Echizen family head, 3rd Count (1885-1965; 15th family head: 1932-1965; 3rd Count: 1932-1947)
 Naomasa, 16th Echizen family head (b. 1919; 16th family head: 1965-)
 Naoyasu (b. 1944)
 Naotaka (b. 1972)
  Tokugawa Hidetada, 2nd Tokugawa Shōgun (1579-1632)
 Tamahime (1599-1622), m. Maeda Toshitsune, 3rd Lord of Kaga (1594-1658)
 Maeda Toshitsugu, 1st Lord of Toyama (1617-1674)
 Maeda Masatoshi, 2nd Lord of Toyama (1649-1706)
 Maeda Toshitaka, 4th Lord of Toyama (1690-1745)
 Maeda Toshitomo, 6th Lord of Toyama (1737-1794)
 Maeda Toshinori, 8th Lord of Toyama (1768-1801)
 Maeda Toshiyasu, 10th Lord of Toyama (1800-1859)
 Maeda Toshikata, 12th Lord of Toyama (1835-1904)
  II. Matsudaira (Maeda) Naokata, 2nd Lord of Maebashi (2nd cr) (1858-1907; Lord: 1869; Governor: 1869-1871; 12th Echizen family head: 1869-1884)

References

External links
 Maebashi on "Edo 300 HTML"

Notes

Domains of Japan
1601 establishments in Japan
States and territories established in 1601
1871 disestablishments in Japan
States and territories disestablished in 1871
Kōzuke Province
History of Gunma Prefecture